Prunus spicata is a species of Prunus native to the islands of Borneo (Malaysia) and Luzon (Philippines). It is a tree, usually 12m but reaching 25m tall, with purplish or  brownish bark. Its herbaceous leaves are elliptic to oblong or lanceolate to ovate, 6 to 18cm long and 2.5 to 6.5cm wide, having rounded bases and acute, long tapering or acuminate apices, and zero to two (sometimes four) flat basal glands. Stipules also have glands. Leaves are hairy when young, and usually retain some hairs on their undersides when mature. The flowers have 15 to 30 stamens each, with up to 4mm long filaments and 0.3 to 0.5mm long anthers. The ovaries are densely hairy. The fruits are red (possibly black) when ripe, and have endocarps which are glabrous inside. Its seeds have glabrous testa.

References

 

spicata
Flora of Borneo
Flora of the Philippines
Plants described in 1965